Llandybie ("Saint Tybie's church") is a community which includes a large village of the same name situated  north of Ammanford in Carmarthenshire, Wales.

According to the United Kingdom Census 2001, Llandybie village itself is home to a population of 3,800, while the community – which also includes the villages of Blaenau, Caerbryn, Capel Hendre, Cwmgwili, Pentregwenlais, Penybanc, Pen-y-groes, and Saron – has 8,800 inhabitants, increasing to 10,994 at the 2011 census.

It was in Llandybie, in 1943, that the mineral Brammallite was found for the first time. Llandybie hosted the National Eisteddfod of Wales in 1944.

The village is served by Llandybie railway station on the Heart of Wales Line and the A483 road which is the main road. Llandybie Community Primary School is located in the north-easterly fringe of the village.

The community is bordered by the communities of: Dyffryn Cennen; Cwmamman; Betws; Ammanford; Llanedi; Llannon; Gorslas; and Llanfihangel Aberbythych, all being in Carmarthenshire.

Notable people
 Anne Ceridwen Rees (1874 in Pentregwenlais – 1905), a Welsh physician who practiced in New Jersey 
 Jenny Ogwen, former actress and TV presenter

References

Sources

External links 
www.geograph.co.uk : photos of Llandybie and surrounding area
Llandybie CP School

Communities in Carmarthenshire
Villages in Carmarthenshire